Bopsula evelinae is a species of dugesiid triclad, the only one in the genus Bopsula. This species is found in Brazil.

References

Dugesiidae
Monotypic protostome genera